Tephrosia elongata is a plant native to Africa south of the equator. It occurs from northern and eastern South Africa to the highlands of Malawi and Tanzania.

Varieties
Three varieties are recognized: 
 Tephrosia elongata E.Mey. var. elongata
 Tephrosia elongata var. lasiocaulos Brummitt
 Tephrosia elongata var. tzaneenensis (H.M.L.Forbes) Brummitt

References

 

elongata
Flora of Southern Africa
Flora of Malawi
Flora of South Africa
Flora of Tanzania